Ralf Bucher (born 6 April 1972 in Munich) is a former German football player and current manager.

Career 
He spent all of his professional career so far with SpVgg Unterhaching, including two seasons in the Bundesliga as team captain and retired on 2 July 2009.

References

External links
 

1972 births
Living people
German footballers
SpVgg Unterhaching players
Bundesliga players
2. Bundesliga players
3. Liga players
Association football defenders
Footballers from Munich